Peter David Englander  is the former chairman of Bridges Fund Management, a director of Apax Partners, chairman of its Approval Committee, member of the Investment and Exit Committee, and the chief executive of the Apax Foundation.

Early life
Englander won a Kennedy Scholarship to the MIT Sloan School of Management, from which he graduated with an M.S. in management. He received a B.S., with first class honors, in chemical engineering from the University of Manchester Institute of Science and Technology. He subsequently obtained a Ph.D. from the London Business School in the area of economics of innovation.

Career
Englander joined Apax Partners in 1981 and is based in its office in London, United Kingdom. Englander specializes in investments in technology and telecommunications sectors. His deals on behalf of the firm include: Demon Internet, Dr Solomon's, Eyretel, QXL, and Waterstone. Overall, he has been associated with ten IPOs and 19 trade sales for the firm’s portfolio companies.

Previously, Englander worked for Air Products and then for the Boston Consulting Group for three years before joining the firm, when the first U.K. fund was raised. He is chairman of Bridges Ventures.

He currently serves as a trustee of the Kennedy Memorial Trust.

Englander was appointed Officer of the Order of the British Empire (OBE) in the 2020 New Year Honours for services to charity and philanthropy.

Personal life
Peter is married and has three sons.

References

External links
, Profile in Business Week
, Profile in Apax Partners

Year of birth missing (living people)
Living people
Alumni of the University of Manchester Institute of Science and Technology
Alumni of London Business School
Apax Partners
British businesspeople
British philanthropists
Private equity and venture capital investors
MIT Sloan School of Management alumni
Kennedy Scholarships
Officers of the Order of the British Empire